The Manx Museum (Thie Tashtee Vannin) in Douglas, Isle of Man is the national museum of the Isle of Man. It is run by Manx National Heritage. In general, the museum covers 10,000 years the history of the Isle of Man from the Stone Age to the modern era.

The museum serves as headquarters of Manx National Heritage. The museum bears no relation to the institution with the same name founded by Trevor Ashe in 1825.

History 
The Manx Museum and Ancient Monuments Act of 1886 led to the creation of a national museum for the Isle of Man with the aim of preserving the island's cultural and historical heritage. Although there had previously been an institution on the Isle of Man named the Manx Museum, founded by entrepreneur, author, and publisher Trevor Ashe in 1825, it has no relation to the Manx Museum run by Manx National Heritage.

The Manx Museum is partially housed in the original Noble's Hospital building. The site on Crellin's Hill in Douglas was bequeathed by Rebecca Noble, the wife of philanthropist and businessman Henry Bloom Noble in 1885. Rebecca Noble laid the foundation stone but did not live to see the building officially opened.

After the opening of the new Noble's Hospital on Westmoreland Road in 1912, the building lay empty for nearly a decade until the building was handed over to the trustees for the Manx Museum. The Manx Museum opened on 2 November 1922 with Philip Moore Callow Kermode as its director.

The museum was expanded and was significantly remodelled between 1986–89 and a large extension included a lecture and film theatre, and an art gallery. The museum was officially reopened by Queen Elizabeth II, Lord of Mann in 1989.

Exhibitions 

Apart from a number of permanent exhibitions ranging from the archaeological history of the Isle of Man to the natural history collection, several temporary themed exhibitions are shown each year.

Every summer an exhibition covering the Isle of Man Tourist Trophy races and motorcycle racing is shown.

Other recent exhibitions have included This Terrible Ordeal which focused on the experiences of the Manx people in World War I, and the artwork of British artist William Hoggatt.

Visitors 

In 2018 Manx National Heritage stated that there were 100,000 visitors each year on average to the Manx Museum. This figure was disputed by the Isle of Man Newspapers, following a freedom of information request found the recorded numbers to be much less than estimated.The FoI response revealed that in 2015, MNH counted 63,953 visitors into the museum, in 2016 this was 68,602 and in 2017 the number was 72,661, while the numbers represent an increase of 8,708 visitors over three years, this is still 27,339 shy of the number MNH claimed.The Museum stated that due to remodelling of one of the Museum's entrances, "it has become clear that the methodology we use to estimate visitors and users needs to be updated."

Facilities 
The museum has limited parking, a shop, a café and is open daily. The National Art Gallery and the Manx National Library and Archives are also located on the site.

See also
North American Manx Museum in Wisconsin, United States
Castle Rushen
House of Manannan

References

External links
Official website of the Manx Museum.

Museums in the Isle of Man
Musical instrument museums